Hyphodontia is a genus of fungi in the family Hymenochaetaceae (Schizoporaceae in Index Fungorum). The genus was circumscribed by Swedish mycologist John Eriksson in 1958.

Species

H. abieticola
H. adhaerispora
H. alba
H. alienata
H. aloha
H. altaica
H. alutaria
H. apacheriensis
H. arguta
H. aspera
H. barba-jovis
H. boninensis
H. borealis
H. breviseta
H. byssoidea
H. candidissima
H. capitata
H. cineracea
H. crassispora
H. crustosoglobosa
H. cunninghamii
H. curvispora
H. efibulatav
H. erastii
H. erikssoniiv
H. fimbriata
H. fimbriiformis
H. floccosa
H. gossypina
H. hallenbergii
H. halonata
H. hastata
H. hastifera
H. juniperi
H. knysnana
H. lanata
H. latitans
H. macrescens
H. magnifica
H. microspora
H. mollis
H. nespori
H. nesporina
H. niemelaei
H. nothofagi
H. nudiseta
H. ochroflava
H. orasinusensis
H. ovispora
H. pallidula
H. papillosa
H. pelliculae
H. poroideoefibulata
H. propinqua
H. pruniacea
H. pumilia
H. quercina
H. radula
H. rimosissima
H. sambuci
H. serpentiformis
H. setulosa
H. spathulata
H. sphaerospora
H. stipata
H. subalutacea
H. subdetritica
H. subglobosa
H. subscopinella
H. subspathulata
H. taiwaniana
H. tenuicystidia
H. tropica
H. tuberculata
H. tubuliformis

References

Hymenochaetales
Agaricomycetes genera